The random ballot, single stochastic vote, or lottery voting is an electoral system in which an election is decided on the basis of a single randomly selected ballot. 

It is closely related to random dictatorship; the latter is a general rule for social choice, while random ballot is an application of this general rule for electing candidates in multi-constituency bodies. Whilst appearing superficially chaotic, the system has the potential to retain the most attractive characteristics of both first past the post and proportional representation systems in elections to multi-constituency bodies. Random dictatorship was first described in 1977 by Allan Gibbard. Its application to elections was first described in 1984 by Akhil Reed Amar,.

Method and properties
In an election or referendum, the ballot of a single voter is selected at random, and that ballot decides the result of the election.  In this way, each candidate or option wins with a probability exactly equal to the fraction of the electorate favouring that candidate or option.

The random ballot method is decisive, in that there is no possibility of a tied vote, assuming that the selected voter has expressed a preference (if not then another ballot can be selected at random). It is unbiased, in that the probability of a particular result is equal to the proportion of total support that that result has in all the votes.  When used in a single-winner contest, it is also strategyproof, in that there is no advantage in tactical voting.  But it is not deterministic, in that a different random selection could have produced a different result, and it does not conform to majority rule since there is a possibility that the selected voter may be in the minority.

Emergent properties

If the random ballot is used to select the members of a multi-constituency body, it can serve to retain the attractive features of both first past the post and proportional representation.

As the winner of each ballot is chosen randomly, the party with the largest vote share is most likely to get the greatest number of candidates. In fact, as the number of ballots grows, the percentage representation of each party in the elected body will get closer and closer to their actual proportion of the vote across the entire electorate. At the same time, the chance of a randomly selected highly unrepresentative body diminishes.

For example, a minority party with 1% of the vote might have a 1/100 chance of getting a seat in each ballot. In a 50-person assembly, the probability of a majority for this party being chosen by random ballot is approximately (using the binomial distribution CDF)

This is a vanishingly small chance, which negates the possibility of small parties winning majorities due to random chance.

At same time, the random ballot preserves a local representative for each constituency, although this individual may not have received a majority of votes of their constituents.

Prevalence
There are no examples of the random ballot in use in practice, but as a thought experiment, it has been used to explain some of the properties of other electoral systems, and it is occasionally used in real life as a tiebreaker for other methods.

Randomness in other electoral systems
There are various other elements of randomness (other than tie-breaking) in existing electoral systems:

1. Randomly ordering candidates on a list.. It is often observed that candidates who are placed in a high position on the ballot-paper will receive extra votes as a result, from voters who are apathetic (especially in elections with compulsory voting) or who have a strong preference for a party but are indifferent among individual candidates representing that party (when there are two or more). For this reason, many societies have abandoned traditional alphabetical listing of candidates on the ballot in favour of either ranking by the parties (e.g., the Australian Senate), placement by lot, or rotation (e.g., Hare-Clark STV-PR system used in Tasmania and the Australian Capital Territory). When candidates are ordered by lot on the ballot, the advantage of donkey voting can be decisive in a close race.

2. Randomly selecting votes for transfer. In some single transferable vote  (STV) systems of proportional representation, an elected candidate's surplus of votes over and above the quota is transferred by selecting the required number of ballot papers at random. Thus, if the quota is 1,000 votes, a candidate who polls 1,200 first preference votes has a surplus of 200 votes that s/he does not need. In some STV systems (Ireland since 1922, and Australia from 1918 to 1984), electoral officials select 200 ballot-papers randomly from the 1,200. However, this has been criticised since it is not replicable if a recount is required. As a result, Australia has adopted a variant of fractional transfer, a.k.a. the "Gregory method", by which all 1,200 ballot-papers are transferred but are marked down in value to 0.1666 (one-sixth) of a vote each. This means that 1,000 votes "stay with" the elected candidate, while the value of the 1,200 ballot-papers transferred equals only 200 votes.

3. Randomly selecting winners. This method is called sortition: rather than choosing ballots, it chooses candidates directly by lot, with no input from the voters, as if each ballot involved individuals voting for themselves.  This is not the same as random ballot, since random ballot is weighted in favor of candidates who receive more votes.  Random ballot would behave identically to random winner only if all candidates received the same number of votes.

References

Electoral systems